Walden Stubbs is a small, rural village and civil parish in the Selby District of North Yorkshire, England. At the 2011 Census, the population was less than 100, so the details are included in the civil parish of Womersley.

The village is mentioned in the Domesday Book, where it is described as consisting of seven households and two ploughlands. The name of the village derives from either Old German, Waldin or the Old English son of Walda. The second part, Stubbs is the Old English term for tree stumps.

The village was historically part of the West Riding of Yorkshire until 1974.

The Askern Branch Line runs through this village, which has two level crossings. There is also the occasional diverted passenger train from the East Coast Main Line.

References

External links

Civil parishes in North Yorkshire
Selby District
Villages in North Yorkshire